Alethea Ada McGrath (1 June 1920 – 9 February 2016) was an Australian actress and comedian. She played Jocasta Nu in Star Wars: Episode II – Attack of the Clones.

Her roles on television included Dot Farrar in Prisoner and three different roles in Neighbours: Miss Logan in 1985, Mary Crombie in 1989 and 1991, and Lily Madigan in 1998. In the 2000s, she played Mrs. Lillie in Romulus, My Father (2007) and Miss Taylor in Knowing (2009).

Before concentrating on acting professionally, McGrath taught drama at Methodist Ladies College, Kew, Melbourne.

She died in a hospital near Melbourne, Australia on 9 February 2016, aged 95.

Filmography

Film

Television

Video games

References

External links

1920 births
2016 deaths
Actresses from Melbourne
Australian film actresses
Australian soap opera actresses
Australian video game actresses
Australian voice actresses
Drama teachers
Place of birth missing
20th-century Australian actresses
21st-century Australian actresses